Sengoku Ninja Tai (Japanese: The Sengoku's Greatest Ninja) is an arcade video game released by Data East in December 1980. Also known as Ninja, Sengoku Ninja Tai was the second game released for the DECO Cassette System, following Highway Chase also released in December 1980. The objective of the game is to shoot the ninjas before they reach the top of the castle.

References

External links

1980 video games
Action video games
Arcade video games
Arcade-only video games
Data East video games
Video games about ninja
Video games developed in Japan
Data East arcade games